Pherosphaera hookeriana, or Mount Mawson pine (previously known as Microstrobos niphophilus), is a dwarf conifer endemic to Tasmania, at altitudes above 600 meters. There are roughly 30 known sites, with population numbers in the tens of thousands. The species occurs in a range of habitats typically in areas near water bodies, mostly on dolerite derived soils. The species is highly fire sensitive and an increase in fire events associated with climate change may lead to local extinction and fragmentation of habitat.

Description
Pherosphaera hookeriana is a densely-branched erect shrub or small tree growing to heights of 5 meters, branches are often small and rigid with leaves arranged spirally and fully appressed to the stem. Individual leaves can measure up to 1.5 mm long, and 1 mm wide, leaves are thick, blunt and concave with a rounded keel. 
Male flowers form in compressed, terminal globular cones, ranging from 1–5 mm in diameter, with 8 to 15 fertile scales, each scale has two pollen sacs on the abaxial surface. 
Female flowers occur in cones on short branches that usually droop (hence the old common name). The flowers are globular, 2–4 mm long and have 3-8 fertile scales, with a single ovule on the upper surface of each. When the seed is ripe it has a hard, glossy brown coat and is approximately 1 mm in diameter (Curtis & Morris 1975, Hill 1998).

Identification and ecology
Pherosphaera hookeriana is a dwarf conifer that has been recorded to grow up to 5 meters, but in exposed and harsh environments it may only attain a height of 0.5 meters (Minchin 1983). The foliage of Pherosphaera hookeriana is well adapted to the high altitudinal ranges it occupies, with small imbricate scale leaves, the stomata are restricted to the adaxial surface and protected by a marginal leaf frill (Hill and Brodribb 1999). The species is generally dioecious, with the reproductive organs occurring on specialised leaves arranged in cone like structures.
Pollen is wind dispersed and seed ripening occurs by late April (Wood & Rudman 2015). It is unclear if the plant produces seed annually or produces mass seed every few years (mast seeding). Germination appears to happen only rarely and is restricted to moist, shady areas. The seed is noted as having a dormant period, which could potentially result in a soil-stored seed bank with germination being staggered over several years. It is unknown how long the seed is viable in the soil for, but preliminary studies show that the seed requires warm stratification and then cold stratification to elicit germination; so the earliest it can take place is in the second spring/summer following dispersal (Wood & Rudman 2015). The seedlings superficially resemble small lycopods, with narrow spreading leaves. The seeds drop within a few meters of the parent plant. It has been suggested that dispersal over long distances via water is possible for plants occurring near lakes and rivers. Pherosphaera hookeriana may form extensive clonal colonies via vegetative growth (Fitzgerald 2011).
Like most endemic alpine conifers to Tasmania, the growth rate of Pherosphaera hookeriana is extremely slow. Plants that have a stem diameter of 3–6 cm having an estimated age of 250–300 years on Mawson Plateau (Minchin 1983) with the actual maximum ages likely exceeding 500 years. The time frame for plants to reach reproductive maturity is unknown, though there were observations of fruiting plants on the Tarn Shelf in 2016 in areas that suffered fire damage in 1966. Pherosphaera hookeriana is one of only two species in the genus, and is one of the five taxa in the family Podocarpaceae with four being endemic to Tasmania (de Salas & Baker 2016). This species can be confused with the more widespread and often co-occurring Tasmanian endemic shrubby conifer, Diselma archeri.

Distribution and habitat
Pherosphaera hookeriana is endemic to Tasmania's west, southwest and central plateau, the current distribution of the species is most likely to be a reflection of post-glacial expansion from refugia and subsequent fire events (Kirkpatrick & Dickinson 1984) Pherosphaera hookeriana exists in altitudinal ranges from 600 to 1300 meters above sea level in a wide range of habitats from alpine to Sphagnum bogs, the common element through the environments the species inhabits is the high soil moisture content and annual rainfall. There are confirmed records indicating that the species ranges from the Walls of Jerusalem in the north to Mount La Perouse in the south (Tasmanian threatened species guide 2016). Most populations of the species occurs on soils derived from Jurassic dolerite, with an exception being a stand in Artichoke Valley near Frenchmans Cap, which grows on sedimentary deposits.

Population
Mount Field has long been recognized as the stronghold for the species with areas of coniferous heath being dominated or co-dominated by the species. There are approximately 30 known stands with an estimated population of 20,000 individuals. There is a high likelihood that stands of the species undiscovered, particularly in the Walls of Jerusalem National Park.

Conservation
Pherosphaera hookeriana is listed under the old name Microstrobos niphophilus as vulnerable under the Tasmanian Threatened species protection act of 1995, after having its classification updated from rare in 2001. The chance of the whole species being lost in a single disaster is very unlikely, given its wide geographic range, however the chance of local extinction in individual stands or subpopulations appears to be increasing (the Lake Mackenzie fire in early 2016 is evidence of the threat fire poses to montane conifers). Populations at lower altitudes closer to more flammable vegetation communities are considered to be at extreme risk of fire damage over the coming decades. Another prominent issue is that anecdotal reports suggest that the rate of seedling germination and establishment is extremely low. The possibility that many of the stands of this species are clonal in combination with the breeding strategy, could potentially set a limit on viable seeds in some areas. Climate change and the trends towards a warmer climate, with a greater chance of extreme events such as drought and fires, are likely to have a direct and adverse effect on populations of Pherosphaera hookeriana. Severe declines or local extinctions in more susceptible regions are predicted to occur by the end of the century.

References 

 Curtis, W.M. & Morris, D.I. (1975). The Students Flora of Tasmania, Part 1. Second edition. Government Printer, Hobart.
 De Salas, M.F. & Baker, M.L. (2016) A Census of the Vascular Plants of Tasmania, Including Macquarie Island. (Tasmanian Herbarium, Tasmanian Museum and Art Gallery. Hobart) www.tmag.tas.gov.au
 Fitzgerald, N. (2011). Establishment Report for Tasmanian Wilderness World Heritage Area Climate Change Monitoring Program: Montane Conifers. Nature Conservation Report Series 11/06, Resource Management and Conservation Division, DPIPWE, Hobart.
 Hill, R. S. & Brodribb, T. J. (1999). Southern conifers in time and space. Australian Journal of Botany 47: 639–696.
 Kirkpatrick, J.B. & Dickinson, K.J.M. (1984). The impact of fire on Tasmanian alpine Listing Statement for Pherosphaera hookeriana (mount mawson pine) vegetation and soils. Australian Journal of Botany 32: 613–629.
 Minchin, P.R. (1983). A Comparative Evaluation of Techniques for Ecological Ordination using Simulated Vegetation Data and An Integrated Ordination –Classification Analysis of the Alpine and Subalpine Plant Communities of the Mt. Field Plateau, Tasmania. Ph.D. Thesis, University of Tasmania, Hobart.
 Wood, J. & Rudman, T. (2015). Montane Conifer Seed Collection Project. Internal Report to the Royal Tasmanian Botanical Gardens and the Natural Values Conservation Branch, Department of Primary Industries, Parks, Water and Environment, Hobart.
 https://www.naturalvaluesatlas.tas.gov.au/downloadattachment?id=16151

Podocarpaceae
Endemic flora of Tasmania